The following is a list of stations or terminals used by Greyhound Lines, either currently in use or historic former Greyhound stations.

Canada

Gare d'autocars de Montréal, Montreal
Union Station Bus Terminal, Toronto
Pacific Central Station, Vancouver

Mexico
Monterrey Greyhound Bus Station, Monterrey
Nuevo Laredo Greyhound Bus Station, Nuevo Laredo

United States

Arkansas
Blytheville Greyhound Bus Station, Blytheville, NRHP-listed
Greyhound Bus Station, Little Rock.

California
Bakersfield Greyhound Station, 1820 18th Street
Chico station
Delano Greyhound Station, 1112 High St
Fresno station
Gilroy station
Hayward station
Indio station, 83100 Indio Boulevard
Lodi Transit Station
Madera Intermodal Center
Merced Transportation Center
Modesto Transportation Center
Oakland Greyhound Station, 2103 San Pablo Ave
Palm Springs station
Paso Robles station
Redding station
Reedley station
Roseville station
Sacramento Greyhound Station, 420 Richards Blvd
Salinas station
San Jose Diridon station
San Rafael Transit Center, San Rafael
Santa Barbara station
Santa Fe Passenger Depot, Fresno
Suisun–Fairfield station
Tracy Transit Center
Transbay Transit Center, San Francisco
Truckee station
Tulare Greyhound Station, 407 N K St
Visalia Transit Center
Victor Valley Transportation Center
Greater Los Angeles, Greater Los Angeles
San Diego County
12th & Imperial Transit Center (MTS Transit Center), San Diego
El Cajon Transit Center (MTS Transit Center), El Cajon
Escondido Transit Center
Oceanside Transit Center
San Ysidro Transit Center (MTS Transit Center), San Ysidro

Colorado
Avon Station, Avon
Copper Creek Transit Center, Winter Park 
Denver Union Station, Denver 
Eco Transit, Vail
RTD Federal Center Station, Lakewood
Fraser Station, Fraser
Glenwood Springs (Amtrak station), Glenwood
Granby Station, Granby
Grand Junction Regional Airport, Grand Junction
Greeley-Evans Transportation Center, Greeley
Harmony Transfer Center, Fort Collins
Hayden Station, Hayden
Hot Sulphur Springs Station, Hot Sulphur Springs
Idaho Springs Station, Idaho Springs
Kremmling Station, Kremmling
Lamar Transit Center, Lamar
Muddy Pass Station, Kremmlin
Parshall Station, Parshall
Paperback Trading Post, Walsenburg
Pueblo Transit Center, Pueblo
Reata Travel Stop, Sterling
Steamboat Springs Station, Steamboat Springs
Tabernash Station, Tabernash
Tejon Park and Ride, Colorado Springs
Trinidad Station, Trinidad
Uptown Video, Rocky Ford

Connecticut
Bridgeport (Metro-North station), Bridgeport
New Haven Union Station, New Haven
New London Union Station, New London
Stamford Transportation Center, Stamford
Hartford Union Station, Hartford

Delaware
7-Eleven at 654 North Dupont Highway, Dover
Wilmington (Amtrak station), Wilmington

District of Columbia
Washington Union Station

Florida
Daytona Beach Greyhound Station
Orange Park Florida
Orlando Station
Miami Station
Ft. Myers Bus Station Fort Myers
Panama City Greyhound Station, Panama City
Ft. Lauderdale Station
 Gainesville, Florida

Georgia
 Atlanta Bus Station, 232 Forsyth St SW, Atlanta, GA 30303
 Athens Bus Station,  4020 Atlanta Hwy Athens, GA 30606
 Augusta Bus Station,  1546 Broad St, Augusta, GA 30904
 Columbus Bus Station, 818 Veterans Pkwy, Columbus, GA 31901
 Macon Terminal, 65 Spring St, Macon, GA 31201
 Marietta Bus Station, 1250 S Marietta Pkwy, Marietta, GA 30060
 Norcross Terminal,  2105 Norcross Pkwy, Norcross, GA 30071
Savannah Bus Station, 610 W Oglethorpe Ave Savannah, GA 31401 Savannah, GA
 Valdosta Bus Station, 200 N Oak St, Valdosta, GA 31601

Illinois
Illinois Terminal, Champaign
Cumberland (CTA station), Chicago
95th/Dan Ryan (CTA station), Chicago
Union Station, Chicago
Naperville (Metra), Naperville

Indiana
Greyhound Bus Terminal, Evansville, NRHP-listed
Gary Metro Center (NICTD), Gary
Indianapolis Union Station, Indianapolis
South Bend International Airport, South Bend
South Street Station, South Bend

Kansas 

 Lawrence Vermont St at West 7th Street
 Topeka 600 South East Quincy Street

Kentucky
Ashland (Amtrak station)
Bowling Green 55 Parker Avenue
Paducah 2719 Irvin Cobb Drive
Louisville 720 West Muhammad Ali Boulevard
Lexington 477 NorthWest New Circle Road

Louisiana
Baton Rouge
New Orleans Union Passenger Terminal, New Orleans

Maryland
Aberdeen (MARC station), Aberdeen
Baltimore Greyhound Terminal, Baltimore
Gulf at 212 Sunburst Highway, Cambridge
College Park–University of Maryland station, College Park
Allegany College of Maryland, Cumberland
Cumberland (Amtrak station), Cumberland
Sunoco at 8359 Ocean Gateway, Easton
Frederick Transit Center, Frederick
Frederick Municipal Airport, Frederick
Frostburg State University, Frostburg
Pilot Travel Center at 3000 Chestnut Ridge Road, Grantsville
7-Eleven at 911 Ontario Street, Havre de Grace
New Carrollton (WMATA station), New Carrollton
University of Maryland Eastern Shore Student Center, Princess Anne
Shore Transit-tri County, Salisbury
Silver Spring Transit Center, Silver Spring
White Marsh Station, White Marsh

Massachusetts
Riverside (MBTA station), Newton
South Station Bus Terminal, Boston
Springfield Union Station, Springfield
Worcester Union Station, Worcester

Michigan
Ann Arbor 325 Depot Street
Capital Area Multimodal Gateway
Flint (Amtrak station)
Kalamazoo Transportation Center
Pontiac Transportation Center

Minnesota
Saint Paul Union Depot, St. Paul

Mississippi
Union Station, Jackson
Meridian Union Station, Meridian

Missouri
St. Louis 430 South 15th Street

Nevada

Las Vegas 6675 Gilespie Street

New Jersey
Atlantic City Bus Terminal, Atlantic City
Resorts Casino Hotel, Atlantic City
Walter Rand Transportation Center, Camden
Pennsylvania Station (Newark), Newark

New Mexico
Alvarado Transportation Center, Albuquerque

New York

 Trailways Greyhound Station, Albany
 Buffalo Metropolitan Transportation Center, Buffalo
 Greater Binghamton Transportation Center, Binghamton
 Ithaca Bus Station, Ithaca
 Port Authority Bus Terminal, Manhattan, New York City
 Trailways Bus Station, Rochester
 William F. Walsh Regional Transportation Center, Syracuse
 Utica Union Station, Utica

North Carolina
J. Douglas Gaylon Depot, Greensboro
Rocky Mount (Amtrak station), Rocky Mount

Ohio
Robert K. Pfaff Intermodal Transit Center, Akron
Cambridge
Greyhound Bus Station, Cincinnati
Greyhound Bus Station, Cleveland, NRHP-listed
Columbus Bus Station, Columbus
Dayton
Elyria
Kenton
Lima
Mansfield
Sandusky station, Sandusky
Martin Luther King Jr. Plaza, Toledo
West Salem
Youngstown
Zanesville

Pennsylvania
Allentown
Altoona
Bedford
Doylestown
Easton
Ebensburg
Edinboro University
Erie 208 East Bayfront Parkway
Gouldsboro
Greensburg
Harrisburg
Johnstown
Arnold Palmer Regional Airport, Latrobe
Lewistown
Meadville
Mount Pocono
New Castle
King of Prussia
Philadelphia Greyhound Terminal, Philadelphia 1001 Filbert Street
Grant Street Transportation Center, Pittsburgh 55 Eleventh Street
Scranton
State College
Stroudsburg
Tyrone
York
Zelienople

Rhode Island
Kennedy Plaza, Providence

South Carolina
Greyhound Bus Depot, Columbia, NRHP-listed

Tennessee
Nashville 709 Rep. John Lewis Way South

Texas
Fort Worth Central Station, Fort Worth

Utah
Ogden Intermodal Transit Center, Ogden
Salt Lake City Intermodal Hub, Salt Lake City

Virginia
Lynchburg – Kemper Street Station, Lynchburg
Franconia-Springfield (WMATA station), Springfield  
Williamsburg (Amtrak station), Williamsburg

Washington
Bellingham (Amtrak station), Bellingham
Everett Station, Everett
Kelso Multimodal Transportation Center, Kelso
Pasco Intermodal Train Station, Pasco
Tacoma Dome (Sounder station), Tacoma

Wisconsin
Appleton Transit Center, Appleton
Milwaukee Intermodal Station, Milwaukee

Wyoming
Cheyenne Rodeway Inn on Central Avenue

Future
Gateway Station, Charlotte, North Carolina
Houston Intermodal Transit Center, Houston, Texas

Discontinued

Canada
These stations were served by Greyhound Canada, the Canadian subsidiary of Greyhound Lines, which ceased operations on May 13, 2021.

Ajax Plaza Bus Terminal, Ajax, Ontario
Barrie Bus Terminal, Barrie, Ontario
Belleville Transit Terminal, Belleville, Ontario
Downtown Brampton Terminal, Brampton, Ontario
Edmonton station, Edmonton, Alberta
Guelph Bus Terminal, Guelph, Ontario
Guelph Central Station, Guelph, Ontario
Terry Fox station, Kanata, Ontario
Kelowna, British Columbia
Kingston Bus Terminal, Kingston, Ontario
Charles St. Transit Terminal, Kitchener, Ontario
Sportsworld Crossing Transit Loop, Kitchener, Ontario
London Greyhound Terminal, London, Ontario
Toronto Pearson International Airport, Mississauga, Ontario
Gare d'autocars de Montréal, Montreal, Quebec
Niagara Falls Transit Terminal, Niagara Falls, Ontario
North Bay station, North Bay, Ontario
Yorkdale Bus Terminal, North York, Ontario
Oshawa Bus Terminal, Oshawa, Ontario
Ottawa Central Station, Ottawa, Ontario 
Peterborough Greyhound Terminal, Peterborough, Ontario
Scarborough Centre Bus Terminal, Scarborough, Ontario
St. Catharines Transit Downtown Terminal, St. Catharines, Ontario
Sudbury Ontario Northland Bus Terminal, Sudbury, Ontario
Toronto Coach Terminal, Toronto, Ontario
Union Station (Fairmont Royal York), Toronto, Ontario
Pacific Central Station, Vancouver, British Columbia
Windsor International Transit Terminal, Windsor, Ontario
Winnipeg Bus Terminal, Winnipeg, Manitoba

United States
Baltimore Travel Plaza, Baltimore, Maryland
Corning (Amtrak station), Corning, California
Trenton Transit Center, Trenton, New Jersey
Staunton (Amtrak station), Staunton, Virginia
Aurora (Metra), Aurora, Illinois
Dempster-Skokie (CTA station), Skokie, Illinois
Decatur Greyhound Station, Decatur, Georgia (defunct 2005 - now a restaurant)
Graham, NC Graham City Depot (Now Abandoned)

References
General reference

Inline references

Greyhound